The Bristol & Exeter Railway (B&ER) was an English railway company formed to connect Bristol and Exeter. It was built on the broad gauge and its engineer was Isambard Kingdom Brunel. It opened in stages between 1841 and 1844. It was allied with the Great Western Railway (GWR), which built its main line between London and Bristol, and in time formed part of a through route between London and Cornwall.

It became involved in the gauge wars, a protracted and expensive attempt to secure territory against rival companies supported by the London and South Western Railway (LSWR) which used the narrow gauge, later referred to as standard gauge.

At first it contracted with the GWR for that company to work the line, avoiding the expense of acquiring locomotives, but after that arrangement expired in 1849, the B&ER operated its own line. It opened a number of branches within the general area it served: to Clevedon, Cheddar, Wells, Weston-super-Mare, Chard, Yeovil and Tiverton.

The B&ER was financially successful but amalgamated with the GWR in 1876, the combined company being called the Great Western Railway.

History

Formation and construction

The Great Western Railway (GWR) obtained its authorising Act of Parliament in 1835, to build its line between London and Bristol. The merchants of Bristol were anxious to secure a railway route to Exeter, an important commercial centre and a port on the English Channel, giving easier shipping connections to continental Europe. They promoted the Bristol and Exeter Railway and when they issued a prospectus on 1 October 1835, they had little difficulty in securing subscriptions for the £1,500,000 scheme.

Isambard Kingdom Brunel was appointed engineer—he was also engineer to the GWR—and his assistant William Gravatt surveyed the route, leading to presentation of a Parliamentary Bill for the 1836 session. The Bill had an easy passage and was enacted on 19 May 1836. The Act did not specify the gauge of the track; branches at Bridgwater and to Tiverton were authorised. Notwithstanding the apparent family connection to the neighbouring GWR, none of the B&ER directors was also a GWR director at this time. The GWR was still under construction.

The early euphoria turned to great difficulty in raising finance for construction. 4,000 of the 15,000 subscribed shares were forfeited for non-payment of calls before the line was built. A contract was let for the first part of the line, from a temporary terminus at Pylle Hill, west of the New Cut (an arm of the River Avon). The position improved somewhat in 1838, and indeed the Company obtained Parliamentary powers for four short branches: of these only one, to Weston-super-Mare, was actually built.

It was not until 5 March 1839 that the Company adopted the broad gauge, having observed the practical results of its use on the GWR.

In the autumn of 1839, the Directors informed the half-yearly meeting of shareholders that it was now planned to make a priority of forming the line from Temple Meads (connecting with the GWR there) to Bridgwater, Somerset, in order to generate some income. Five locomotives were ordered from Sharp, Roberts & Co for the purpose.

By the end of 1839 the Directors had decided to avoid the capital outlay by arranging with the GWR—by now in operation—to operate the line for them. By this time three Directors were also directors of the GWR, and the alliance was beginning to strengthen. The proposal to lease the line to the GWR was ratified by shareholders at a special meeting in September 1841. The lease was to commence on the opening of a double line from Bristol to Bridgwater and Weston-super-Mare, at a rent of £30,000 annually and a toll of a farthing per passenger-mile and per ton-mile of goods and coal (but no toll for mails, parcels, horses, carriages or cattle). The rent was to increase proportionally with the completion of the system, and the lease was to remain in force for five years after completion of the line to Exeter.

Opening the main line
The first section of the line was opened between Bristol and Bridgwater on 14 June 1841, just before the GWR completed its line from London to Bristol. There was no B&ER station at Bristol; a temporary wooden platform at the GWR station was used, and as that station faced London, a backing movement was necessary to reach the point of convergence of the GWR line and the B&ER connecting line.

The stations on opening were Nailsea, Clevedon Road, Banwell, Weston Junction, Highbridge and Bridgwater on the main line; Weston-super-Mare was the only station on its branch, which was operated by horse traction. (The subsequent renaming of stations is listed below.)

In 1841 money was a little easier to come by, and contracts were let for the completion of the line, which was opened onward from Bridgwater in stages:

 Bridgwater to Taunton on 1 July 1842
 Taunton to Beam Bridge (on the Exeter Turnpike) on 1 May 1843; Beam Bridge was a temporary terminus, closed when the onward section to Exeter opened
 Beam Bridge to Exeter on 1 May 1844. The Exeter station was at the site now known as Exeter St Davids station.

The opening to Exeter completed the B&ER main line, and with the GWR formed a combined broad gauge line from London to Exeter with a mileage of 194 miles, far longer than any other line at the time. The Directors were able to report that the whole construction had been carried out for the £2 million originally authorised, "a most unusual experience in those days".

On 4 July 1844 the South Devon Railway obtained its authorising Act of Parliament: the broad gauge would soon be continuous from London to Plymouth.

Gauge war: a duplicate route to Exeter
The rival London and South Western Railway (LSWR) had its main line from London to Southampton, and was planning to extend to Exeter. The GWR wished to prevent this by promoting its own lines in the region. At this period Parliament considered that only one line was appropriate to serve any particular area, and naturally each company wished their own allies' lines to be authorised. The LSWR was a narrow gauge railway (later referred to as standard gauge) and the GWR and B&ER were broad gauge lines; the intense rivalry to secure territory was referred to as the gauge wars.

In 1845 the Wilts, Somerset and Weymouth Railway (WS&WR) was promoted by the GWR. The GWR now saw it as the beginning of a line to Exeter to exclude the LSWR proposal, and as this would harm the position of the B&ER the GWR offered to purchase the B&ER company, which it was leasing. This was put to a B&ER shareholders' meeting and rejected by a considerable majority.

Feeling that it had acted in good faith, the GWR now promoted a modified version of the Wilts, Somerset & Weymouth scheme, and a line that became called the Exeter Great Western, from Yeovil to Exeter via Crewkerne and Axminster.

The B&ER felt alienated from the GWR. Brunel saw that his position as Engineer to both companies was compromised, and resigned from the B&ER at the end of September 1846, being succeeded by Charles Hutton Gregory.

The B&ER naturally opposed these schemes, joining with the LSWR in doing so, and in the 1846 Parliamentary session they were rejected. The Exeter Great Western proposal was presented again in the 1847 session, and the B&ER again opposed the scheme, itself promoting a branch from Durston (east of Taunton) to Castle Cary (on the WS&WR). The Exeter Great Western scheme was again rejected, but the B&ER Castle Cary line was approved. However, by now the financial collapse following the "railway mania" had occurred, and the B&ER never proceeded with that scheme.

The LSWR too had experienced difficulty in making its proposed line to Exeter, and, in continuation of the struggle to exclude the narrow gauge company, the GWR and B&ER jointly promoted a line in 1852 from Maiden Newton on the WS&WR line (which was not yet completed) via Axminster to join the B&ER at Stoke Canon. This line was to be called the Devon and Dorset Railway; the journey from London to Exeter would have been ten miles longer over it than by the existing line via Bristol.

This was presented in Parliament in the 1853 session, and became part of a bitter fight for the so-called coast line: LSWR trains now reached Dorchester and that company proposed its own line. In Committee, witnesses for and against the respective lines appeared, but the B&ER were absent. The proposed broad gauge line was rejected on 30 June.

Gauge war: Crediton and the LSWR
In 1845 an Act of Parliament authorised the Exeter and Crediton Railway (E&CR), a six-mile (10 km) line from Cowley Bridge, a short distance north of Exeter. A railway had already been authorised in North Devon: the Taw Vale Railway and Dock, a short line at Barnstaple. Little had been done there until 1845, when the proprietors obtained authorisation to revive their powers and build the line; they hoped to sell their enterprise, now called the Taw Vale Extension Railway, to another company, the North Devon Railway which was intending to seek its Act for a Barnstaple to Crediton line in 1846.

Meanwhile, competing proposals were submitted to the 1846 session of Parliament for railways to connect Barnstaple to the network. The B&ER wished to make a line from their (proposed) Tiverton station, but that was rejected in favour of the Taw Vale Railway Extension and Dock Company, from Barnstaple to join the Exeter and Crediton line at Crediton. This scheme was supported by the London and South Western Railway (LSWR), which aspired to expand into Devon.

The Exeter and Crediton line and the North Devon line had been expected to be built on the broad gauge and naturally to fall into the B&ER camp; lease terms had been provisionally agreed. However, the London and South Western Railway (LSWR) had designs on entering North Devon, and encouraged friendly relations with the companies. At an E&CR shareholders' meeting on 11 January 1847 the provisional lease was rejected, and this was quickly followed by rejection of the TVER lease; more favourable leases to the LSWR were negotiated and ratified by shareholders in January and February 1847. The B&ER had lost control of the Crediton and Barnstaple lines.

J W Buller of the B&ER was chairman of the E&CR board, and despite the very large shareholder opinion, he attempted to keep the E&CR within the B&ER family, and personally signed a two-year contract with George Hennett to work the line on 7 April 1847. However at an Extraordinary General Meeting on 12 April 1847, Buller and three other B&ER directors were removed from office amid angry scenes.

The E&CR had been built on the broad gauge, and when tempers had cooled, a lease was agreed in February 1851 that the B&ER would work the line, and install the junction with their own line at Cowley Bridge; these works would be at the expense of the E&CR. The E&CR opened on 12 May 1851, for the time being effectively a branch of the B&ER.

On 19 July 1860 the London and South Western Railway (LSWR) reached Exeter, after a long struggle. It had its own station, Queen Street, in a more central location than the B&ER station, and much higher than it. They already had interests in railways to the west of the B&ER line, and earlier thoughts had turned to an independent line crossing the B&ER line to reach the Crediton line, but wiser counsel prevailed, and an accommodation with the B&ER was reached. By arrangement, Parliamentary authority was obtained for a connecting line descending from the LSWR station to St Davids, and the addition of narrow gauge rails to the line from there to Crediton. The LSWR service started on 1 February 1862.

The Exeter (St Davids) station had been built in a one-sided arrangement with separate up and down sections. The increase of traffic and the arrival of LSWR trains made this very difficult to operate; in 1862 work was started on a new conventionally arranged station, and this was opened in July 1864. Taunton station received a corresponding treatment in August 1868. At Weston-super-Mare, the terminus was modernised and expanded, and the branch line doubled, in 1866. At Bristol, the project was much more difficult; work started in March 1871 but was not completed until 1 January 1878, after amalgamation of the B&ER and the GWR; the new station was joint with the Midland Railway.

Independent operation
The Bristol & Exeter Railway was a considerable financial success, and between 1844 and 1874 paid an average annual dividend of 4.5%.

As already described, the Bristol & Exeter took over the working of its line in 1849, and the two companies, B&ER and GWR, were completely distinct. Through passenger trains operated with shared rolling stock, and once again there was no common director.

J. B. Badham was appointed as Secretary and General Superintendent, and after a false start, James Cresswell Wall was appointed Traffic Superintendent, transferring to Chief Goods Agent on 1 January 1855; Henry Dykes succeeded him as Traffic Superintendent. C. H. Gregory remained Chief Engineer until the post was abolished in June 1851. In June 1850 James Pearson took over the locomotive department; at first his workshops were in Exeter, but they were removed to Bristol towards the end of 1851. Extensive goods facilities were also provided there at this time, as well as a roof for the Bristol "express platform", earning it the local nickname, the cowshed.

With money now coming in, and in anticipation of independent operation, the Company had built a carriage works and coke ovens at Bridgwater. George Hennet had arranged to cast pipes there for the atmospheric system on the South Devon Railway, and the Bristol and Exeter Railway simply extended his works. The Hennet name continued to be linked to Bridgwater for many years, and was responsible for producing many wagons for various companies.

In 1852 the Company installed the electric telegraph throughout its main line, at the time a remarkably progressive investment. It was the first substantial British railway to operate the block system.

In 1852 the company started construction of a handsome headquarters building at Temple Meads; it was designed by Samuel Fripp and opened in 1854.

Branches and subsidiary routes

In the early part of 1844, with the main line nearly complete, the B&ER promoted a branch from near Taunton to Yeovil and Weymouth. At the same time the GWR decided to promote several branches from its main line, and during the course of 1844 the GWR determined to build a line from near Chippenham to Yeovil and Weymouth: this became the Wilts, Somerset and Weymouth Railway. The B&ER shortened its intended branch to run to Yeovil only.

In the 1845 Parliamentary session, the B&ER obtained authorisation for the Yeovil branch, branches to Clevedon and Tiverton, and a direct junction line at Bristol connecting its line with the GWR. Early the same year the Company had at last constructed its own Bristol terminus (authorised in the original Act); this was at right angles to the GWR station. The connecting line formed an arc by-passing both Bristol stations, and an "express platform" was built on it to allow through passenger trains to make a station call; both directions of trains used the single platform. The Tiverton branch proved especially contentious due to the determined opposition of the Grand Western Canal, which foresaw the end of any income; when the parliamentary opposition was overcome, the Canal Company offered every obstruction in the construction of the railway crossing.

The Clevedon branch ( from Clevedon Road, renamed Yatton, was opened to traffic on 28 July 1847, and the Tiverton branch from Tiverton Road, renamed Tiverton Junction, opened on 12 June 1848. The Tiverton branch passed under the Grand Western Canal, and Brunel constructed Halberton aqueduct to carry the canal over the new line.

Work was also started on the Yeovil branch from Durston, but due to the new commitment to expenditure on rolling stock, the work was not pressed to completion and opening was delayed by several years. The work was resumed in 1852 and pressed ahead; the whole line to a Yeovil station at Hendford was opened to passengers on 1 October 1853, and to goods on 26 October 1853. With the approach of the Wilts, Somerset and Weymouth line of the GWR, the B&ER branch was extended from Hendford across Yeovil to the GWR station at Pen Mill; this extension opened on 2 February 1857, the same day as the GWR line from Frome to Yeovil.

The West Somerset Railway was authorised in 1857 to make a line from the B&ER west of Taunton to Watchet, where there was a small harbour. There were serious difficulties in raising the necessary capital (£140,000) and the line finally opened on 31 March 1862 for passengers; goods traffic was handled from August 1862. The line was leased to the B&ER in perpetuity. The West Somerset Railway was extended to Minehead by the Minehead Railway, opening as a broad gauge single line on 16 July 1874.It was worked by the B&ER.

On 17 June 1852 the Somerset Central Railway was authorised; it was friendly to the B&ER, which had subscribed considerable capital to it. It was to build from Highbridge Wharf, crossing the B&ER main line there, and running to Glastonbury, mostly along the route of the Glastonbury Canal. While the lease was in force, it was extended to Burnham-on-Sea at the north-west end (on 3 May 1858) and to Wells at the south-east end (on 15 March 1859), making  in total.

In 1856 power had been obtained to extend to Bruton, on the GWR; the Dorset Central Railway, a narrow gauge line, also obtained powers to join the Somerset Central near Bruton. On 3 February 1862 the lines were completed and the Somerset Central began operating the entire line, on the narrow gauge. In August 1862 the two lines joined together to form the Somerset and Dorset Railway. The junction with the GWR was never built, and the entire line had abandoned any allegiance to the B&ER.

The Chard and Taunton Railway obtained authorisation in 1861 but was unable to raise the capital needed; the B&ER took over the powers and opened the single line branch to passengers on 11 September 1866, and to goods in March 1867. The Chard station was joint with the LSWR, who had a branch from their main line at Chard Junction.

The Portishead branch was built by the Bristol and Portishead Pier and Railway Company, and opened on 18 April 1867. The B&ER worked it but it was maintained by the building company. It was a broad gauge single line.

The Somerset and Dorset Railway proposed a line from Yatton to Wells in opposing a B&ER scheme for a Wells branch; by negotiation the B&ER took over the Yatton to Wells scheme, and the broad gauge line was opened on 3 August 1869 as far as Cheddar, and extended to a station at Tucker Street in Wells on 5 April 1870. The new line made a physical connection with the Somerset and Dorset Railway there, but safety concerns led to a prohibition on through passenger working to the GWR line to the south. The development of this issue is discussed in the article Cheddar Valley Line.

The Devon and Somerset Railway obtained authorisation to build from Watchet Junction (later Norton Fitzwarren) to Barnstaple, in 1864. The company found great difficulty in raising the necessary finance, but opened to Wiveliscombe on 8 June 1871, and throughout on 1 November 1873. The line was broad gauge and single, with heavy gradients. It was worked by the B&ER for half the gross receipts.

It was constructed by the GWR and B&ER jointly, with much work being undertaken at the harbour by the Corporation of Bristol. It was a single line, and mixed gauge, although neither the GWR nor the B&ER had narrow gauge trackage in the area. It was soon decided to extend to Wapping Wharf, where more space was available, and this was authorised in 1873, but the opening took place after the B&ER amalgamated.

Narrowing the gauge
Apart from the short LSWR running sections at Exeter and Yeovil, the B&ER had been exclusively broad gauge. Now in 1866 the Somerset and Dorset Railway (S&DR) proposed building a Bridgwater branch from their line. To head this encroachment off, the B&ER undertook to lay narrow gauge rails on their own line from Highbridge, where the S&DR joined it, to Bridgwater quay, and from there to Yeovil via Durston (where trains reversed). Narrow gauge passenger and goods rolling stock was acquired, and with the track works the scheme cost £125,000. A daily B&ER narrow gauge goods train ran from November 1867, and after resolution of authorisation difficulties with the LSWR, some narrow gauge passenger trains ran from Yeovil Pen Mill to Durston, with some extensions to Highbridge. However, the volume of traffic was very disappointing, and five of the eight locomotives purchased for the workings were converted to broad gauge by 1871.

In 1859 the B&ER took over from Bridgwater Corporation a short horse tramway between their station and the wharf. Having acquired the Bridgwater and Taunton Canal, the B&ER owned the canal dock, and the B&ER then converted the tramway for locomotive operation, and extended it to the dock. It was opened as mixed gauge in November 1867. An opening bridge across the River Parrett was commissioned in March 1871.

At Dunball, a coal wharf had long existed, bringing in coal from South Wales and despatching it to Devon destinations. The B&ER extended the primitive wharf there and made a mixed gauge branch to it, opening in November 1869.

If the broad gauge had originally been an asset, the reality by the 1870s was that the narrow gauge of  had become the standard gauge, and beyond the Great Western Railway the vast majority of lines adopted it. As trade increased, this led to troublesome difficulties at the point of junction between lines—the break of gauge—where goods had to be physically transshipped between wagons for onward transit. In July 1874 the Somerset and Dorset Railway completed its Bath extension, and narrow gauge wagons could reach Exeter and beyond from the Midlands over that route and the LSWR.

Responding to the reality, the B&ER started to lay narrow gauge rails—that is, it installed mixed gauge—on its main line. In February 1875 the shareholders were informed that the Company was undertaking the installation throughout the main line; this would involve a considerable investment in rolling stock. In 1875 an Act was obtained authorising this work and the raising of capital to pay for it; and to substitute a loop line at Weston-super-Mare for the branch line.

Mixed gauge was installed from Bristol to Taunton by 1 June 1875, enabling the heavy goods and livestock traffic to be accommodated in narrow gauge trains, and the Weston-super-Mare branch had already been dealt with. The line on to Exeter was completed in November 1875. The Cheddar Valley line from Yatton to Wells was converted (as opposed to "mixed") by 18 November 1875. Plans were in hand to deal with the rest of the system.

Amalgamation and after
During this expensive upheaval, the Directors quickly determined that amalgamation with another Company with greater financial resources, was needed. The Midland Railway was considered, but meaningful negotiation started with the neighbouring Great Western Railway. The talks were quickly finalised, and a lease to the GWR from 1 January 1876 was ratified by special shareholders' meetings. The GWR was to pay 6% on ordinary share capital. Actual amalgamation took place on 1 August 1876. The South Devon Railway amalgamated with the GWR on 1 February 1876, and the GWR now owned the line throughout from London to Plymouth.

Under GWR ownership, the train service pattern continued with some variations. However, towards the end of the nineteenth century it became increasingly clear that the route form London to Exeter via Bristol was inconvenient, and steps were taken to provide a shorter route. This was built in stages, but on 20 May 1906 the new route was opened, running via Newbury and Castle Cary, joining the old B&ER line at Cogload Junction, east of Taunton. The original route section between Bristol and Cogload Junction was diminished in importance as most through trains were diverted to the new route, which was  shorter.

The 1906 junction at Cogload was conventional, but increasing traffic led to delays. Under the Development (Loan Guarantees and Grants) Act 1929, the GWR received Government financial assistance to carry out improvement works, and the opportunity was taken to provide a grade-separated junction at Cogload; the Down Bristol line was carried over the Castle Cary lines on a truss bridge. Other improvements to stations and layout enhancements were carried out between Taunton and Exeter, including quadrupling of the line between Taunton and Norton Fitzwarren and considerable enlargement of both stations, and provision of goods bypass lines and an enlarged engine shed at Taunton. These improvements were commissioned progressively between 1931 and 1933.

Train services
The ordinary trains of the Bristol and Exeter line were not especially remarkable; attention is given to the through trains between London and Exeter, over the GWR and the B&E, and of course via Bristol. Despite the claimed superiority of the broad gauge, train speeds were not much better than on the standard gauge. Lord Dalhousie was charged by Parliament to form a committee to comment on the gauge question, and the committee's report in January 1845 stated, "The actual speed of trains on the Great Western Railway, [implying broad gauge lines in general] as shown by the published time-tables and by official returns, is not so high as upon some narrow gauge Railways ..."

This was soon further accelerated to four and a half hours, but the B&ER added two stops—at Weston Junction and Tiverton Junction—in May 1849, slowing the down train by 15 minutes. The B&ER section was run from Bristol Express Platform to Exeter ( in an hour and 45 minutes in 1846 and two hours in 1849.

The relatively slow speed of the best trains was not considered a problem until the LSWR put on a fast train on their line, 25 minutes faster to Exeter and from 1 March 1862 a -hour train was put on; at Bristol the down train backed into the B&ER terminus for the station call. These trains were "far and away the fastest in the world". However, in the succeeding years the timings were slowed once again. In 1871 the service was again accelerated to 94 minutes Bristol to Exeter. "Thus the Bristol and Exeter Company shared with the Great Western the distinction of running the fastest trains in the world. Ordinary trains took three or four hours.

Cheap excursions in the summer were popular: for 1s 6d excursionists could go from Bristol to Weston and back, and for 1s from Bristol to Cheddar or from Taunton to Watchet. Excursion platforms were set up at Bedminster, Weston and Clevedon, apparently to segregate the excursionists from ordinary passengers.

Ticket platforms, of course involving an additional stop, existed from the earliest days outside Bristol and Exeter, and from 1870 on either side of Taunton.

The 1850 Bradshaw shows six down and seven up passenger trains; all called at all stations except two trains each way, which were probably through trains from and to London. Although the best journey time Bristol to Exeter ( was two hours, most trains required up to  hours; it may be that these trains were mixed and time was spent at stations shunting goods wagons.

After amalgamation
On 20 July 1874, while amalgamation was being negotiated, the Somerset and Dorset Railway—not yet joint—opened its Bath extension. It was friendly with the Midland Railway (MR) and the LSWR, and a rival route from the industrial Midlands and North of England to Exeter was created, On 17 May 1876 the LSWR reached Plymouth, using running powers over the South Devon Railway (SDR), and now the rival route could carry goods to Plymouth.

In July 1877 a new express passenger train was put on between London and Plymouth; it was named the Zulu, joining the existing Flying Dutchman. A further broad gauge express, the Jubilee was put on from July 1887, but the number of broad gauge passenger trains was declining. However, another broad gauge express, named The Cornishman, was started from June 1890, The gauge conversion west of Exeter enabled through carriages from Manchester, Liverpool and Leeds to be conveyed from Bristol by a new narrow gauge express between London and Torquay, from 1892.

From 20 July 1896, a Newquay portion of the Cornishman ran non stop from London to Exeter, via the Bristol Relief Line, running in summer only until 1899 when it ran all the year round. From July 1904 non-stop expresses ran from London to Plymouth and back; at first lightly loaded they were referred to as The Limited, although they were later branded The Cornish Riviera Express.

The opening in 1906 of the Castle Cary cut-off enabled the journey time for these expresses to be reduced, and gradually many (but not all) of the London to Plymouth trains transferred to the new route. The Bristol to Taunton section of the original B&ER thus lost much of its importance, although trains on the North-and-West Route were significant.

The development of seaside holidays advanced considerably in the twentieth century, and through trains to Devon and Cornwall were especially busy in the summer, particularly on Saturdays. Although London was the dominant originating point, trains ran from Wolverhampton, and also from Manchester and Bradford, in many cases over the North-and West Route. The popularity of Minehead and Ilfracombe put especial pressure on Taunton and Norton Fitzwarren, and layout enhancements at those places took place in the 1920s.

Two world wars forced a suspension of development, but holiday towns gained further in significance in peacetime. The majority of trains made calls at Weston-super-Mare (rather than avoiding the town by running on the original main line) and by 1960 many Paddington to Bristol expresses continued to Weston-super-Mare. The town had long been popular as an excursion destination, and a new station there, primarily for terminating holiday and excursion trains, was opened on 8 April 1914; adjacent to the main station it was simply a development of the excursion platform at the original terminal (branch) station: it did not receive a distinct name, Weston-super-Mare Locking Road, until 1930. It closed on 6 September 1964. The main station was named Weston-super-Mare General until 20 September 1953, then reverting to simply Weston-super-Mare, regaining the suffix from 6 May 1958 until 6 September 1964.

Following 1945 holiday traffic to Devon and Cornwall developed considerably, and working over the B&ER line was congested, with increasing volumes of traffic from the Midlands and North; but by the mid-1960s rail travel to holidays in Britain declined rapidly, and the former heavy workings all but vanished, especially over the Bristol to Taunton section. However, since 1994 that route has revived with a frequent service operated (2014) by Arriva UK Trains under the subsidiary CrossCountry trains. West of Cogload junction the London services continue.

The Weston-super-Mare loop continues in operation for local passenger traffic, although that volume has declined considerably. Fuller details are given in the article Bristol to Exeter line.

The Exeter and Crediton line, lost to the B&ER early on, also remains open as part of a rural branch line; passenger services are operated under the brand name Tarka Line.

The line formed by the West Somerset Railway and the Minehead Railway closed, but reopened as a heritage railway, also using the name the West Somerset Railway.

Engineering features

William Gravatt was resident engineer for the construction between Bristol and White Ball (near Wellington, Somerset; usually spelt Whiteball in railway publications). William Froude supervised the section from there to Exeter.

South of Weston-super-Mare the line crosses the western end of the Mendip Hills, at Uphill, through a deep cutting spanned by a  masonry arch bridge, known locally as Devil's Bridge, which is built into the rock sides. It crosses Bleadon Hill cutting and was "the best and tallest example of this kind of structure". It is a Listed Building grade II. The line then runs south across the Somerset Levels.

At Bridgwater a retractable or Telescopic Bridge was built in 1871 to the design of Sir Francis Fox. It carried a short industrial branch line over the River Parrett to the docks, but the bridge had to be movable, to allow boats to proceed upriver. It was manually operated for the first eight months, and then powered by a steam engine, reverting to manual operation in 1913, when the steam engine failed. The bridge was last opened in 1953, and the traverser section was demolished in 1974, but public outcry at the action resulted in the bridge being listed as a Scheduled Ancient Monument, and the rest of the bridge was kept. It was later used as a road crossing, until the construction of the Chandos road bridge alongside it, and is now only used by pedestrians. Parts of the steam engine were moved to Westonzoyland Pumping Station Museum in 1977. The bridge is now a Grade II* listed building.

Work started in 1838 and was completed in 1841. Brunel left the centring in place as the foundations were still settling, but in 1843 complaints that navigation was being interfered with had to be responded to. He said that "although the Arch itself is still perfect, the movement of the foundations has continued ... and the centres have, in consequence, been kept in place. [As instructed] by the Directors, measures are being adopted to enable us to remove these centres immediately, at the sacrifice of the present arch."

Brunel demolished the brick arch and replaced it with a timber arch, which was in turn replaced in 1904 by a steel girder bridge.

At Taunton the River Tone was straightened to avoid the need for two bridges close together. West of Taunton gradients of 1 in 80 were needed to cross the Blackdown Hills and at the summit on the Somerset-Devon border the  Whiteball Tunnel was constructed.

William Froude, resident engineer for the western section of the main line, developed an empirical method of setting out track transition curves and introduced an alternative design to the helicoidal skew arch bridge at Rewe and Cowley Bridge Junction, near Exeter.

Topography
After leaving Bristol, the main line was laid on easy curves and gradients as far as Taunton; there is a slight summit at Flax Bourton cutting the line is generally level, in part traversing the Somerset Levels, running north-west of the Mendip Hills and south-east of the Quantock Hills. From Taunton the gradients are more difficult, with some sharper curvature. The line crosses the flank of the Blackdown Hills. There is a summit at Whiteball, approached by a ten-mile (16 km) climb from Taunton, stiffening to typically 1 in 80 in the final . In the up direction, the climb is practically continuous from Exeter to Whiteball, on moderate gradients as far as Cullompton, then stiffening to 1 in 155 with a final  at 1 in 115.

Line and station openings
Note: openings after the end of independent existence of the B&ER in 1876 are shown in italic

 Main line (Opened to Bridgwater 1971; to Taunton 1842; to Beam Bridge 1843; and to Exeter 1844)
 Bristol; superseded by Temple Meads station jointly with the GWR on 6 July 1874
 Bedminster; opened 1871
 Parson Street Halt; opened 29 August 1927; renamed Parson Street November 1933
 Ashton; closed January 1856; reopened as Long Ashton 12 July 1926; closed 6 October 1941
 Nailsea; renamed Nailsea and Backwell 1 May 1905; renamed Nailsea 6 May 1974
 Clevedon Road; renamed Yatton 1847
 Banwell; renamed Worle 3 August 1869; renamed Puxton 1 March 1884; renamed Puxton and Worle 1 March 1922; closed 6 April 1964; reopened a short distance west in 1990
 Weston Junction; closed 1 March 1884
 Bleadon and Uphill; opened 1871; renamed Bleadon and Uphill 1872; closed 5 October 1964
 Brent Knoll; opened 1875; closed 4 January 1971
 Highbridge
 Dunball; opened 1873; renamed Dunball Halt 6 November 1961; closed 5 October 1964
 Bridgwater
 Durston; opened 1 October 1853; closed 5 October 1964
 Taunton
 Norton Fitzwarren; opened 1 June 1873; closed 30 October 1961
 Wellington; closed 5 October 1964
 Beambridge; temporary terminus; closed 1844
 Burlescombe; opened 1867; closed 5 October 1964
 Sampford Peverell; opened 9 July 1928; closed 5 October 1964; reopened as Tiverton Parkway on 12 May 1986
 Tiverton Road; renamed Tiverton Junction 12 June 1848; closed 11 May 1986
 Cullompton; closed 5 October 1964
 Hele; renamed Hele and Bradninch 1867; closed 5 October 1964
 Silverton; opened 1 November 1867; closed 5 October 1964
 Stoke Canon; opened 1860; relocated south 2 July 1894; closed 13 June 1960
 Exeter.
 Portishead branch (From Portishead Junction; opened 18 April 1867. Worked by the B&ER.)
 Station detail given at Portishead Railway
 Clevedon branch(From Yatton; opened 28 July 1847; closed 3 October 1966.)
 Clevedon
 Cheddar Valley line (From Yatton; also known as the Strawberry Line.)
 Station list given at Cheddar Valley Line
 Weston-super-Mare branch (From Weston Junction; opened 14 June 1841; closed 1 March 1884; superseded by Weston-super-Mare loop)
 Weston-super-Mare
 Weston-super-Mare loop (Opened by GWR on 1 March 1884. (Included here because of its intimate connection with the B&ER main line.)
 Worle; opened 1 March 1884; closed 2 January 1922
 Weston Milton Halt; opened 3 July 1933
 Weston-super-Mare
 Yeovil branch (From Durston.)
 Station list given at Yeovil to Taunton Line.
 Chard branch (From Creech St Michael. Opened to passengers 11 September 1866, and to goods in March 1867. Closed to passengers in 1962, and to goods traffic in 1966.)
 Station list given at Chard Branch Line.
 Tiverton branch (From Tiverton Junction. Opened on 12 June 1848. Closed on 5 October 1964.)
 Halberton Halt; opened 5 December 1927
 Tiverton
 Minehead branch (From Watchet Junction, later Norton Fitzwarren; opened to Watchet 31 March 1862 and extended to Minehead on 16 July 1874. Worked by B&ER. Closed in 1971 and reopened in 1976 as a heritage line.)
 Station list given at West Somerset Railway.
 Barnstaple branch (From Watchet Junction; opened to Wiveliscombe 8 June 1871, and on to Barnstaple 1 November 1873. Worked by B&ER. Closed in 1966.)
 Station list given at Devon and Somerset Railway.

Locomotives

Locomotives for the railway were provided by the Great Western Railway until its working arrangement finished on 1 May 1849, after which the Bristol and Exeter provided its own locomotives. Engine sheds were provided at major stations and on some branches, and workshops were established at Bristol in September 1854.

Charles Hutton Gregory was responsible for the locomotives until May 1850, when James Pearson was appointed as Locomotive Engineer. He designed several classes of tank engines, including his distinctive large 4-2-4T locomotives, the first of which were introduced in 1854.

Notes

See also
 The Great Western Mail Robbery 1849

References

Further reading

  (for note on Exeter St Davids above).

 
Great Western Railway constituents
7 ft gauge railways
Pre-grouping British railway companies
Rail transport in Somerset
Rail transport in Devon
Companies formerly listed on the London Stock Exchange
Railway companies established in 1836
Railway lines opened in 1844
Railway companies disestablished in 1876
History of Somerset
History of Devon
1836 establishments in England
Works of Isambard Kingdom Brunel
British companies disestablished in 1876
British companies established in 1836